Patrick Michael Rafter (born 28 December 1972) is an Australian former world No. 1 tennis player. He reached the top Association of Tennis Professionals (ATP) singles ranking on 26 July 1999. His career highlights include consecutive US Open titles in 1997 and 1998, consecutive runner-up appearances at Wimbledon in 2000 and 2001, winning the 1999 Australian Open men's doubles tournament alongside Jonas Björkman, and winning two singles and two doubles ATP Masters titles.

He became the first man in the Open Era to win Canada Masters, Cincinnati Masters and the US Open in the same year, which he achieved in 1998; this achievement has been dubbed the American Summer Slam. To date, only two players have followed this feat: Andy Roddick in 2003, and Rafael Nadal in 2013. Rafter is the third man in the Open Era to reach semifinals or better of every Grand Slam tournament in both singles and doubles, after Rod Laver and Stefan Edberg, and remains the last man to date to accomplish this. Rafter is also the only player to remain undefeated against Roger Federer with at least three meetings, though the meetings took place early in Federer's career. He is also the only player with a winning record over the Swiss on all the three main surfaces: hard, clay and grass.

Tennis career
Rafter turned professional in 1991. During the course of his career, he twice won the men's singles title at the US Open and was twice the runner-up at Wimbledon. He was known for his serve-and-volley style of play.

Early years (1991–1996)
Rafter won his first tour-level match in 1993, at Wimbledon. He reached the third round, before losing to Andre Agassi. He also reached the semifinals in Indianapolis. He defeated Pete Sampras in the quarterfinals in three tight sets, before losing to Boris Becker in the semifinals. Rafter finished 1993 with a ranking of 66.

Rafter won his first career singles title in 1994 in Manchester. Prior to 1997, this was the only ATP singles title he had won.

Breakthrough and stardom (1997–1999)
Rafter's breakthrough came in 1997. At that year's French Open, he reached the semifinals, falling in four sets to two time former champion Sergi Bruguera. Then, he surprised many by winning the US Open, defeating Andriy Medvedev, Magnus Norman, Lionel Roux, Andre Agassi, Magnus Larsson, and Michael Chang before beating Greg Rusedski in a four-set final; he was the first non-American to win the title since Stefan Edberg in 1992. This was his first Grand Slam title, and catapulted him ahead of Chang to finish the year ranked #2 in the world (behind only Pete Sampras). The unexpected nature of his US Open title led many, including Hall-of-famer and four-time US Open champion John McEnroe to criticise Rafter as a "one-slam wonder".

Rafter had a particularly strong year in 1998, winning the Canadian Open and the Cincinnati Masters ─ Andre Agassi (1995), Andy Roddick (2003), and Rafael Nadal (2013) are the only other players to have won both of these tournaments in the same year. Rafter defeated ninth-ranked Richard Krajicek in the Toronto final and second-ranked Pete Sampras in the Cincinnati final. When asked about the difference between himself and Rafter following their titles, Sampras responded, "10 grand slams". He added that a tennis player must come back and win a Grand Slam again in order to be considered great.

Entering the U.S. Open as the defending champion, Rafter reached the final by defeating Hicham Arazi, Hernán Gumy, David Nainkin, Goran Ivanišević and Jonas Björkman before besting Sampras in a five-set semifinal. Rafter then defended his US Open title by defeating fellow Australian Mark Philippoussis in four sets, committing only five unforced errors throughout the match. Altogether, Rafter won six tournaments in 1998, finishing the year No. 4 in the world.

Rafter won the Australian Open men's doubles title in 1999 (partnering Jonas Björkman), making him one of few players in the modern era to win both a singles and doubles Grand Slam title during their career (fellow countryman Lleyton Hewitt would later achieve this feat in 2001). He and Björkman also won a doubles titles at the ATP Masters Series event in Canada (1999) At the 1999 French Open, Rafter drew future world No. 1 and 20-time Grand Slam champion Roger Federer in the first round, making him the first-ever opponent of Federer in the main draw of a Grand Slam tournament. Rafter defeated him in four sets. Rafter then reached the Wimbledon semifinals for the first time in 1999, losing in straight sets to Agassi. This was the first of three consecutive years that the two met in the Wimbledon semifinals. July 1999 saw Rafter holding the world No. 1 men's singles ranking for one week, making him the shortest-reigning world No. 1 in ATP Tour history. As the two-time defending US Open champion, Rafter lost in the first round of the tournament, retiring in the fifth set against Cédric Pioline after succumbing to shoulder tendinitis. Rafter's shoulder injury wound up being serious enough to necessitate surgery.

Due to injury, Rafter was unable to play in the 1999 Davis Cup final won by Australia; however, he won important matches in the earlier rounds to help the team qualify.

Late career (2000–2003)

Rafter's ranking had fallen to No. 21 by the time he reached the Wimbledon final in July 2000. In the semifinals, he defeated Agassi 7–5, 4–6, 7–5, 4–6, 6–3. The match was hailed as a classic, particularly because of their contrasting playing styles, with Agassi playing primarily from the baseline and Rafter attacking the net. Rafter faced Sampras in the final, who was gunning for a record-breaking seventh Wimbledon title overall (and seven in the past eight years). While Rafter made a strong start to the match and took the first set, after the match he would claim that he had "choked" part way through the second set tie-break, and was then not able to get back into his game. Sampras won in four sets.

Rafter played on the Australian Davis Cup Team that lost in the final in 2000 (to Spain) and 2001 (to France). Rafter played on the Australian teams that won the World Team Cup in 1999 and 2001.

In 2001, Rafter reached the semifinals of the Australian Open. Despite holding a two sets to one lead and having the support of the home crowd, Rafter lost the match to Agassi in five sets. Later in the year, Rafter again reached the Wimbledon final. For the third straight year, he faced Agassi in the semifinals and won in yet another five-setter, 2–6, 6–3, 3–6, 6–2, 8–6. Much like the previous year's semifinal, this match also received praise for the quality of play that the two men displayed. In the final, it was originally scheduled to play on the second Sunday but was rescheduled to the third Monday due to the other semifinal between Goran Ivanišević and Tim Henman played on three separate days, he squared off against Ivanišević, who had reached the Wimbledon final three times before but had slid down the rankings to World No. 125 following injury problems. In a five-set struggle that lasted just over three hours, Ivanišević prevailed. He played his last match at the Davis Cup final on rubber, winning the singles but losing the doubles.

Rafter did not play any tour matches in 2002. He spent the year recovering from injuries. In January 2003, he announced his retirement from professional tennis, stating that he had lost all motivation to compete at the top level.

Comebacks and post-retirement activities
The 5,500-seat centre court of the Queensland Tennis Centre in Brisbane, Australia, was named Pat Rafter Arena in Rafter's honour. In 2002, he won the Australian of the Year award. This created some controversy, as he had spent much of his career residing in Bermuda for tax purposes.

Rafter did return at the beginning of the 2004 season to play doubles at two tournaments only; the 2004 Australian Open and the 2004 AAPT Championships (in Adelaide). However, he lost in round one of both events, playing alongside Joshua Eagle.

In 2005, Rafter won the International Club's prestigious Jean Borotra Sportsmanship Award.

He was elected to the International Tennis Hall of Fame and inducted into the Sport Australia Hall of Fame in 2006. On Australia Day 2008, Rafter was inducted into the Australian Tennis Hall of Fame.

In 2009, as part of the Q150 celebrations, Rafter was announced as one of the Q150 Icons of Queensland for his role as a "sports legend".

In October 2010, Rafter was announced as Australia's Davis Cup captain. Rafter stood down as Australia's Davis Cup captain on 29 January 2015. He was succeeded by Wally Masur.

On 12 January 2014, Rafter—then aged 41—announced that he would be partnering current Australian number one Lleyton Hewitt in the doubles draw of the 2014 Australian Open. The comeback, however, was short-lived, as the pair went down in straight sets to eventual runner-ups Eric Butorac and Raven Klaasen in the first round.

ATP Champions Tour
At the 2009 AEGON Masters Tennis, Rafter lost his opening round robin match against the 1987 Wimbledon Champion and fellow Aussie Pat Cash 2–6, 6–2, 10–6. In a much anticipated match and replay of the 2001 Wimbledon final, Rafter faced Goran Ivanišević. Rafter won the match when Ivanisevic retired while serving for the opening set, 3–5. Despite his performance, the retirement was enough to push Rafter into the final against Stefan Edberg. In what is described as a spell-binding serve-and-volley showdown, Rafter won the match 6–7, 6–4, 11–9. This represented the first time that Rafter was able to defeat Edberg.

Career statistics

Grand Slam performance timeline

Finals: 4 (2 titles, 2 runners-up)

Video
 Wimbledon 2000 Semi-Final – Agassi vs. Rafter (2003) Starring: Andre Agassi, Patrick Rafter; Standing Room Only, DVD Release Date: 16 August 2005, Run Time: 213 minutes, ASIN: B000A343QY.
 Wimbledon 2001 Final: Rafter Vs Ivanisevic Standing Room Only, DVD Release Date: 30 October 2007, Run Time: 195 minutes, ASIN: B000V02CT6.

See also

 List of male underwear models

References

External links
 
 
 
 
 
 
 
 

1972 births
Australian expatriate sportspeople in Bermuda
Australian male tennis players
Australian of the Year Award winners
Australian Open (tennis) champions
Australian people of Irish descent
Hopman Cup competitors
International Tennis Hall of Fame inductees
Living people
Olympic tennis players of Australia
People from Mount Isa
Sport Australia Hall of Fame inductees
Tennis people from Queensland
Tennis players at the 2000 Summer Olympics
US Open (tennis) champions
Grand Slam (tennis) champions in men's singles
Grand Slam (tennis) champions in men's doubles
Australian republicans
ATP number 1 ranked singles tennis players